Diana Karenne (born Leucadia Konstantia; 1888 – 14 October 1940) was a Polish film actress and director. 

She appeared in more than 40 films between 1916 and 1940. In 1917, she opened her film production company in Milan. Injured in a World War II Allied bombing raid on Aachen (Aix-la-Chapelle) in July 1940, after three months in a coma, she died in October of the same year without having regained consciousness.

Selected filmography
 Sofia di Kravonia (1916)
 Redemption (1919)
 Miss Dorothy (1920)
 Sophy of Kravonia; or, The Virgin of Paris (1920)
 Playing with Fire (1921)
 Marie Antoinette, the Love of a King (1922)
 Poor Sinner (1923)
 The Wife of Forty Years (1925)
 The Loves of Casanova (1927)
 The Golden Vein (1928)
 Pawns of Passion (1928)
 A Woman with Style (1928)
 The White Roses of Ravensberg (1929)
 The Queen's Necklace (1929)

References

External links
 

1888 births
1940 deaths
Emigrants from the Russian Empire to Germany
German film directors
German silent film actresses
20th-century German actresses
20th-century Polish actresses
Polish film actresses
Polish silent film actresses
Polish women film directors
Polish women film producers
Polish film producers
Polish civilians killed in World War II
Actors from Kyiv
People from Kievsky Uyezd
People from the Russian Empire of Polish descent
Ukrainian people of Polish descent
Writers from Kyiv
Deaths by airstrike during World War II
Women film pioneers
German women film directors